This is a list of notable events in country music that took place in 2008.

Events
 April 27 – A story in the New York Daily News reported a possible long-term relationship between Mindy McCready and baseball star Roger Clemens that began when she was 15 years old. Though Clemens' attorney, Rusty Hardin, acknowledged that McCready was a "close family friend," Hardin denied the affair and threatened to bring a defamation suit against him. However, McCready would state that the relationship was sexual, and spoke about her affair with Clemens in more detail on the November 17 broadcast of Inside Edition.
 May 15 – People Magazine reported Canadian singer Shania Twain and her husband, music producer Robert John "Mutt" Lange, had separated after 14 years of marriage. The couple were married on December 28, 1993, after Twain met Lange at Nashville's Fan Fair earlier in the year.
 May 23 – Anne Murray performs her final concert in Toronto, Ontario, Canada and retires from show business.
 June 14 – Sara Evans and radio show host/former University of Alabama quarterback Jay Barker are married in Franklin, Tennessee, with their children as their attendants.
 November 11 – Country music superstar Reba McEntire departs her longtime record label MCA Nashville, after 24 years and signed to The Valory Music Co., sister label to Big Machine Records. McEntire and Big Machine CEO Scott Borchetta had previously worked together in the 1990s when Borchetta was senior president of promotion for MCA Nashville.
 November 20 – Julianne Hough announces that she would not be returning for the foreseeable future to Dancing with the Stars in order to further her country music career.
 December 7 – The John F. Kennedy Center for the Performing Arts honors George Jones for his lifetime contributions to the arts.
 December 18 – Equity Music Group, a label owned by Clint Black, closes after five years in operation.

Top hits of the year
The following songs placed within the Top 20 on the Hot Country Songs or Canada Country charts in 2008:

Top new album releases
The following albums placed within the Top 50 on the Top Country Albums charts in 2008:

Other top albums

Deaths
 January 6 – Ken Nelson, 96, record producer for artists including Hank Thompson, Buck Owens, Merle Haggard and many others.
 April 22 – Paul Davis, 60, crossover artist whose collaborations with Marie Osmond and Tanya Tucker reached No. 1 in the 1980s. (heart attack)
 May 1 – Jim Hager, 66, country singer and actor who along with his twin brother Jon were regulars on Hee Haw from 1969 to 1986. (heart attack)
 May 5 – Jerry Wallace, 79, crossover artist who scored several country hits during the 1970s including the No. 1 "If You Leave Me Tonight I'll Cry" in 1972. (congestive heart failure)
 May 8 – Eddy Arnold, 89, country and pop singer whose career spanned seven decades. (natural causes)
 May 11 – Dottie Rambo, 74, southern gospel singer-songwriter. (bus accident)
 July 16 – Jo Stafford, 90, crossover artist from the 1940s with hits "Feudin’ and Fightin" and "Temptation". (congestive heart failure)
 August 11 – Don Helms, 81, steel guitarist and member of Hank Williams' Drifting Cowboys. (heart attack) 
 August 31 – Jerry Reed, 71, country singer and actor best known for his 1971 crossover hit "When You're Hot, You're Hot" (emphysema)
 September 12 – Charlie Walker, 81, honky tonk singer best known for "Pick Me Up On Your Way Down" (colon cancer)
 December 24 – Alf Robertson, 67, Swedish country musician.

Hall of Fame inductees

Bluegrass Music Hall of Fame inductees
Bill Clifton
Charles Wolfe

Country Music Hall of Fame inductees
 Tom T. Hall (1936-2021), singer and songwriter, known as "The Storyteller"
 Emmylou Harris (born 1947), neo-traditional singer and songwriter
 The Statler Brothers (Harold Reid (1939–2020), Don Reid (born 1945), Phil Balsley (born 1939), Lew DeWitt (1938–1990), Jimmy Fortune (born 1955)), diverse country music group known for pop-styled, nostalgic and gospel songs.
 Ernest "Pop" Stoneman (1893–1968), singer, songwriter, and musician, patriarch of the family group The Stonemans

Canadian Country Music Hall of Fame inductees
 Prairie Oyster
 Brian Ferriman
 Wes Montgomery

Major awards

Grammy Awards
(presented February 8, 2009 in Los Angeles)
 Best Female Country Vocal Performance – "Last Name", Carrie Underwood
 Best Male Country Vocal Performance – "Letter to Me", Brad Paisley
 Best Country Performance by a Duo or Group with Vocals – "Stay", Sugarland
 Best Country Collaboration with Vocals – "Killing the Blues", Robert Plant and Alison Krauss
 Best Country Instrumental Performance – "Cluster Pluck", Brad Paisley, James Burton, Vince Gill, John Jorgenson, Albert Lee, Brent Mason, Redd Volkaert, and Steve Wariner
 Best Country Song – "Stay", Jennifer Nettles
 Best Country Album – Troubadour, George Strait
 Best Bluegrass Album – Honoring the Fathers of Bluegrass: Tribute to 1946 and 1947, Ricky Skaggs and Kentucky Thunder

Juno Awards
(presented March 29, 2009 in Vancouver)
 Country Recording of the Year – Beautiful Life, Doc Walker

CMT Music Awards
(presented April 14 in Nashville)
 Video of the Year – "Our Song", Taylor Swift
 Male Video of the Year – "I Got My Game On", Trace Adkins
 Female Video of the Year – "Our Song", Taylor Swift
 Group Video of the Year – "Take Me There", Rascal Flatts
 Duo Video of the Year – "Stay", Sugarland
 USA Weekend Breakthrough Video of the Year – "I Wonder", Kellie Pickler
 Collaborative Video of the Year – "Till We Ain't Strangers Anymore", Bon Jovi & LeAnn Rimes
 Performance of the Year – "I Wonder", Kellie Pickler
 Supporting Character of the Year – Rodney Carrington in "I Got My Game On"
 Wide Open Country Video of the Year – "Gone Gone Gone (Done Moved On)", Alison Krauss & Robert Plant
 Tearjerker Video of the Year – "I Wonder", Kellie Pickler
 Comedy Video of the Year – "Online", Brad Paisley
 Video Director of the Year – Michael Salomon

Academy of Country Music
(presented April 5, 2009 in Las Vegas)
 Entertainer of the Year – Carrie Underwood
 Top Male Vocalist – Brad Paisley
 Top Female Vocalist – Carrie Underwood
 Top Vocal Group – Rascal Flatts
 Top Vocal Duo – Sugarland
 Top New Male Vocalist – Jake Owen
 Top New Female Vocalist – Julianne Hough
 Top New Vocal Duo or Group – Zac Brown Band
 Top New Artist – Julianne Hough
 Album of the Year – Fearless, Taylor Swift
 Single Record of the Year – "You're Gonna Miss This", Trace Adkins
 Song of the Year – "In Color", Jamey Johnson
 Video of the Year – "Waitin' on a Woman", Brad Paisley
 Vocal Event of the Year – "Start a Band", Brad Paisley and Keith Urban
 Poets Award – Merle Haggard and Harlan Howard
 Jim Reeves International Award – Dolly Parton
 Cliffie Stone Pioneer Award – Hank Williams, Jr., Kenny Rogers, Randy Travis and Jerry Reed
 Tex Ritter Award – Beer for My Horses

Americana Music Honors & Awards 
Album of the Year – Raising Sand (Robert Plant and Alison Krauss)
Artist of the Year – Levon Helm
Duo/Group of the Year – Robert Plant and Alison Krauss
Song of the Year – "She Left Me For Jesus" (Brian Keane and Hayes Carll
Emerging Artist of the Year – Mike Farris
Instrumentalist of the Year – Buddy Miller
Spirit of Americana/Free Speech Award – Joan Baez
Lifetime Achievement: Trailblazer – Nanci Griffith
Lifetime Achievement: Songwriting – John Haitt
Lifetime Achievement: Performance – Jason & the Scorchers
Lifetime Achievement: Instrumentalist – Larry Campbell
Lifetime Achievement: Executive – Terry Licknola
Lifetime Achievement: Producer/Engineer – Tony Brown

ARIA Awards 
(presented in Sydney on October 19, 2008)
Best Country Album – Rattlin' Bones (Kasey Chambers and Shane Nicholson)

Canadian Country Music Association
(presented September 8 in Winnipeg)
 Fans' Choice Award – Doc Walker
 Male Artist of the Year – Johnny Reid
 Female Artist of the Year – Jessie Farrell
 Group or Duo of the Year – Doc Walker
 Songwriter(s) of the Year – "Beautiful Life", written by Murray Pulver, Chris Thorsteinson and Dave Wasyliw
 Single of the Year – "Beautiful Life", performed by Doc Walker
 Album of the Year – Beautiful Life, Doc Walker
 Top Selling Album – The Ultimate Hits, Garth Brooks
 Top Selling Canadian Album – Kicking Stones, Johnny Reid
 CMT Video of the Year – "Beautiful Life", Doc Walker
 Rising Star Award – Jessie Farrell
 Roots Artist or Group of the Year – Corb Lund

Country Music Association
(presented November 12 in Nashville)
 Entertainer of the Year – Kenny Chesney
 Female Vocalist of the Year – Carrie Underwood
 Male Vocalist of the Year – Brad Paisley
 New Artist of the Year – Lady Antebellum
 Vocal Group of the Year – Rascal Flatts
 Vocal Duo of the Year – Sugarland
 Single of the Year – "I Saw God Today", George Strait
 Album of the Year – Troubadour, George Strait
 Song of the Year – "Stay", Sugarland
 Musical Event of the Year – "Gone, Gone, Gone (Done Moved On)", Robert Plant and Alison Krauss
 Music Video of the Year – "Waitin' on a Woman", Brad Paisley and Andy Griffith
 Musician of the Year – Mac McAnally

See also
 Country Music Association
 Inductees of the Country Music Hall of Fame

Bibliography
 Whitburn, Joel, Top Country Songs 1944–2005, 6th Edition. 2005,

References

Country
Country music by year